This is a list of rivers of Brazil.

Alphabetical list of rivers in Brazil

A–C

 Acari River (Rio de Janeiro)
 Acari River (Roraima)
 Acauã River
 Acre River
 Açu River
 Açuã River
 Acurauá River
 Acuriá River
 Adelaide River (Brazil)
 Água Amarela River
 Água Boa do Univini River
 Água Branca River
 Água Fria River (Braço Menor)
 Água Fria River (Tocantins River)
 Água Quente River (Maranhão)
 Água Quente River (Paraná)
 Da Água Morta River
 Aguapeí River (Mato Grosso)
 Aguapeí River (São Paulo)
 Lajeado Agudo
 Aiari River
 Aiuruoca River
 Ajarani River
 Alalaú River
 Alambari River (Tietê River)
 Alambari River (Turvo River)
 Alcântara River
 Alcobaça River (Brazil)
 Da Aldeia River
 Aldeia Velha River
 Alegre River (Espírito Santo)
 Alegre River (Goiás)
 Alegre River (Maranhão)
 Alegre River (Mato Grosso)
 Alegre River (Paraná)
 Alegre River (Rio de Janeiro)
 Almada River
 Das Almas River (Goiás)
 Das Almas River (Maranhão)
 Das Almas River (São Paulo)
 Das Almas River (Tocantins)
 Alonzo River
 Alpercatas River
 Alto Braço River
 Alto Jamari River
 Amajari River
 Amambaí River
 Amanã River
 Amandaú River
 Amanguijá River
 Amapá Grande River
 Amapá River
 Amapari River
 Amazon River
 Amola-Faca River (Caveiras River)
 Amola-Faca River (Itoupava River)
 Amônia River
 Anajás River
 Anamu River
 Anapu River
 Anari River
 Anauá River
 Andirá River (Acre River)
 Andirá River (Amazon River)
 Andirá River (Juruá River)
 Andirá River (Tapajós River)
 Andrade River
 Angelim River
 Anhanduí River
 Anhanduìzinho River
 Anhangabaú River
 Anotaié River
 Das Antas River (Bom River)
 Das Antas River (Goiás)
 Das Antas River (Rio Grande do Sul)
 Das Antas River (Santa Catarina)
 Das Antas River (Tibagi River)
 Antimary River
 Antoninha River
 Apa River
 Apiacá River
 Apiai-Guaçu River
 Apiai-Mirim River
 Apiaú River
 Apodi River
 Apoquitaua River
 Aporé River
 Aporema River
 Apuaê River
 Apuaú River
 Apucarama River
 Apucaraninha River
 Aquidabã River (Mato Grosso do Sul)
 Aquidabã River (Paraná)
 Aquidauana River
 Araçá River
 Aracacá River
 Aracatiaçu River
 Aracatimirim River
 Araçuaí River
 Araguá River
 Araguaia River
 Araguari River (Amapá)
 Araguari River (Minas Gerais) (Das Velhas River)
 Aramá River
 Dos Arantes River
 Arapari River (Amapá)
 Arapari River (Roraima)
 Arapiuns River
 Arara River (Acre)
 Arara River (Amazonas)
 Ararandeua River
 Araranguá River
 Araraquara River
 Araras River (Ivaí River)
 Araras River (Paraná)
 Arari River
 Ararirá River
 Araticu River
 Aratu River
 Arauá River (Aripuanã River)
 Arauá River (Coari River)
 Arauá River (Sergipe)
 Arauã River
 Da Areia River (Goio-Ere River)
 Da Areia River (Iguazu River)
 Areias River (Goiás)
 Areias River
 Aricanduva River
 Arinos River
 Aripuanã River
 Ariranha River
 Arraia River
 Arraial Velho River
 Arraias do Araguaia River
 Arraias River (Mato Grosso)
 Arraias River (Pará)
 Arraias River (Tocantins)
 Arroio Chuí
 Arroio Grande (Santa Catarina)
 Arroio Guaçu River
 Arroio Pelotas
 Arrojado River
 Arrojo River
 Aruã River
 Atelchu River
 Aterro River
 Atibaia River
 Atiparaná River
 Atuá River
 Atucatiquini River
 Auaiá-Miçu River
 Auari River
 Ribeirão Auila
 Aurá River
 Autaz-mirim River
 Avecutá River
 Axuí River
 Azul River (Acre)
 Azul River (Ivaí River)
 Azul River (Mato Grosso)
 Azul River (Piquiri River)
 Azul River (Rio Grande do Sul)
 Babilônia River
 Bacajá River
 Bacajaí River
 Bacaxá River
 Bacuri River
 Badajós River
 Baependi River
 Bagagem River (Goiás)
 Bagagem River (Minas Gerais)
 Bagagem River (Tocantins)
 Bagé River
 Baldum River
 Das Balsas River (Bahia)
 Das Balsas River (Maranhão)
 Das Balsas River (Tocantins)
 Balseira River
 Balsinhas River
 Banabuiú River
 Bananal River (Paraíba do Sul)
 Bananal River (Tocantins)
 Bandeira River (Chopim River)
 Bandeira River (Piquiri River)
 Bandeirantes do Norte River
 Do Banho River
 Baquiá Preto River
 Baquirivu-Guaçu River
 Baracuxi River
 Barão de Melgaço River
 Bararati River
 Barauana River
 Barauaninha River
 Barbado River
 Barbaquá River
 Barra Grande River (Ivaí River)
 Barra Grande River (Tibagi River)
 Barra Grande River (Santa Catarina)
 Da Barra Grande River
 Barra Mansa River
 Ribeirão Barra Mansa
 Barra Nova River
 Barra Seca River
 Barreiro de Baixo River
 Barreiro River (Mato Grosso)
 Barreiro River (Paraná)
 Barreiros River (Mato Grosso do Sul)
 Barreiros River (Tocantins)
 Barro Ouro River
 Batalha River
 Baú River
 Baú River
 Baunilhas River
 Bauru River
 Beberibe River
 Bela Joana River
 Belém River (Paraná)
 Belém River (Rondônia)
 Belo River (Iguazu River)
 Belo River (Ivaí River)
 Benedito River
 Benevente River
 Bengala River
 Das Bengalas River
 Benjamim Constant River
 Bento Gomes River
 Berlengas River
 Bernardo José River
 Betume River (Poxim River)
 Bezerra River (Goiás)
 Bezerra River (Tocantins)
 Biá River
 Bicudo River
 Biguaçu River
 Biritiba-Mirim River
 Bitumirim River
 Bituva River
 Boa Esperança River
 Boa Viagem River
 Boa Vista River
 Boacica River
 Bocaina River
 Bodó River
 Dos Bois River (Crixás Açu River)
 Dos Bois River (Das Almas River)
 Rio dos Bois (Paranaíba River)
 Bom Retiro River
 Bom River
 Bonito River (Alonzo River)
 Bonito River (Caceribu River)
 Bonito River (Canoinhas River)
 Bonito River (Correntes River) (Timbó River)
 Bonito River (Goiás)
 Bonito River (Ivaí River)
 Bonito River (Macaé River)
 Bonito River (Rio das Flores)
 Bonito River (Timbó River)
 Bonito River (Tocantins)
 Borboleta River
 Borrachudo River
 Botas River
 Boucaraí River
 Do Braço River (Santa Catarina)
 Braço do Norte Direito River
 Braço do Norte River
 Braço Menor do Rio Araguaia River
 Braço Norte do Rio Itaúnas
 Braço Norte do Rio São Mateus (Cotaxé River)
 Braço Norte Esquerdo River
 Braço Sul do Rio Itaúnas
 Braço Sul do Rio São Mateus (Cricaré River)
 Bracuí River
 Branco River
 Branco ou Cabixi River
 Branco River (Acre)
 Branco River (Aripuanã River)
 Branco River (Bahia)
 Branco River (Guaporé River)
 Branco River (Jaciparaná River)
 Branco River (Jamari River)
 Branco River (Mato Grosso do Sul)
 Branco River (Pará)
 Branco River (Paraná)
 Branco River (Roosevelt River)
 Branco River (São Paulo)
 Branquinho River
 Brejo Grande River
 Breu River
 De Breves River
 Brigida River
 Brilhante River
 Brioso River
 Brumado River
 Bugre River
 Bulha River
 Buquira River
 Buranhém River
 Buricá River
 Buriti River
 Buriticupu River
 Burro Branco River
 Butiá River
 Caá-Iari River
 Caatinga River
 Cabaçal River
 Cabixi River
 Cabuçu de Cima River (Guapira River)
 Cabuçu River
 Caçador Grande River
 Cacequi River
 Caceribu River
 Cachimbau River
 Cachoeira Grande River
 Cachoeira River (Bahia) (Do Engenho River)
 Cachoeira River (Paraná)
 Cachoeira River (Potinga River)
 Cachoeira River (Timbó River)
 Cachoeira River (São Paulo)
 Cachoeirão River
 Cachoeirinha River
 Cachorro River (Pará)
 Cachorro River (Roraima)
 Cachorro River (Sergipe)
 Cadeia River
 Caeté River (Acre)
 Caeté River (Pará)
 Cafuini River
 Cafundó River (Itiúba River)
 Cágado River (Minas Gerais)
 Cágado River (Sergipe)
 Caí River
 Caiapó River (Goiás)
 Caiapó River (Tocantins)
 Caiapozinho River
 Igarapé Caipora
 Cairari River
 Cais River
 Caiuá River
 Dos Caixões River
 Cajari River
 Cajari River (Pará)
 Cajàzeira River
 Caju River
 Cajupiranga River
 Calabouço River
 Calçado River (Itabapoana River tributary)
 Calçado River (Jacarandá River tributary)
 Calçado River (Rio de Janeiro)
 Calçoene River
 Caldas River
 Camaipi River do Maracá River
 Camaipi River do Vila Nova River
 Camaiú River
 Camanaú River
 Camanducaia River (São Paulo)
 Camaoi River
 Camaquã River
 Camaragibe River
 Camaraipe River
 Camararé River
 Camarazinho River
 Cambé River
 Camboriú River
 Camburu River
 Camisas River
 Da Campanha River
 Campista River
 Campo Alegre River
 Campo Belo River
 Campo Novo do Sul River
 Campo Real River
 Campos Novos River
 Cana Brava River (Paranã River)
 Cana Brava River (Santa Tereza River)
 Cana Brava River (lower Tocantins River)
 Cana Brava River (upper Tocantins River)
 Canã River
 Canastra River
 Canaticú River
 Candeias River
 Cangati River
 Canhoto River
 Canindé River (Ceará)
 Canindé River (Piauí)
 Canoas River (Mampituba River) (Sertão River)
 Canoas River (Minas Gerais)
 Canoas River (Paraná)
 Canoas River (Santa Catarina)
 Canoinhas River
 Cantarinho River
 Canto River
 Cantú River
 Canumã River
 Capanema River
 Capão Grande River
 Capetinga River
 Capiá River
 Capibaribe River
 Capim River
 Capitão Cardoso River
 Capivara River (Araçuaí River)
 Capivara River (Goiás)
 Capivari River (Minas Gerais)
 Capivara River (Paraná)
 Capivara River (Piauí)
 Capivara River (Roraima)
 Capivara River (Santa Tereza River)
 Capivara River (São Paulo)
 Capivara River (Sergipe)
 Capivara River (Tocantins River)
 Capivaras River
 Capivari River (Bahia)
 Capivari River (Mato Grosso do Sul)
 Capivari River (Paraná)
 Capivari River (Paranapanema River)
 Capivari River (Pardo River)
 Capivari River (Rio de Janeiro)
 Capivari River (Santa Catarina)
 Capivari River (São João River)
 Capivari River (Tietê River)
 Capricórnio River
 Capucapu River
 Carabinani River
 Caracol River (Mato Grosso do Sul)
 Caracol River (Rondônia)
 Caracol River (Tocantins)
 Caracu River
 Caraíva River
 Carajá River
 Carajarí River
 Carangola River
 Caratuva River
 Caravelas River
 Carecuru River
 Cariaçã River
 Carinhanha River
 Carioca River
 Caripi River
 Caripunás River
 Cariús River
 Do Carmo River
 Do Carmo River (Minas Gerais)
 Carnaíba de Dentro River
 Carnaíba de Fora River
 Carnaúba River
 Caroaebe River
 Carreiro River
 Caru River
 Carucango River
 Da Casca River
 Cassanje River
 Cassiporé River
 Castelo River
 Catete River (Iriri River)
 Catete River (Itacaiunas River)
 Cati River
 Catolé Grande River
 Catrimani River
 Catu River
 Catundó River
 Cauaburi River
 Cauamé River
 Cauaruau River
 Caurés River
 Cautário River
 Dos Cavalos River
 Caveiras River
 Cavernoso River
 Caxambu River
 Caxias River
 Caxitoré River
 Caxixa River
 Ceará-Mirim River
 Do Cedro River
 Dos Cedros River
 Cerquinha River
 Chalana River
 Chambuiaco River
 Chandless River
 Chapecó River
 Chapecozinho River
 Chiché River
 Chopim River
 Choró River
 Chupador River
 Cinco Voltas River
 Das Cinzas River
 Cipó River
 Ciriquiri River
 Citaré River
 Claro River (Apucaraninha River)
 Claro River (Araguaia River)
 Claro River (Iguazu River)
 Claro River (Ivaí River)
 Claro River (lower Tietê River)
 Claro River (Minas Gerais)
 Claro River (Paranaíba River)
 Claro River (Pardo River)
 Claro River (Preto River)
 Claro River (upper Tietê River)
 Coari River
 Das Cobras River
 Do Cobre River
 Igarapé Cochichá
 Do Coco River
 Codòzinho River
 Coimim River
 Coitinho River
 Do Colégio River
 Colindó River
 Colônia River
 Colorado River
 Comandaí River
 Combate River
 Comemoração River
 Comprido River (Paraíba do Sul)
 Comprido River (São Paulo)
 Conceição River (Ceará)
 Conceição River (Rio de Janeiro)
 Conceição River (Rio Grande do Sul)
 Congonhas River
 Das Contas River
 De Contas River
 Contendas River
 Copatana River
 Coraci River
 Corda River
 Coreaú River
 Corrente River (Bahia)
 Corrente River (Doce River)
 Corrente River (Paranã River)
 Corrente River (Paranaíba River)
 Corrente River (Piauí)
 Corrente River (Rio do Peixe)
 Correntes River (Mato Grosso)
 Correntes River (Santa Catarina)
 Correntes River (Maranhão)
 Corumbá River
 Corumbataí River (Paraná)
 Corumbataí River (São Paulo)
 Corumbiara River
 Coruripe River
 Corvo River
 Cotegipe River
 Coti River
 Cotia River
 Cotingo River
 Cotinguiba River
 Couto de Magalhães River
 Coxá River
 Coxim River
 Coxipó River
 Crauari River
 Crepori River
 Cricou River
 Ribeirão Crisóstomo
 Cristalino River (Teles Pires)
 Crixás Açu River
 Crixás Mirim River
 Crixás River (Goiás)
 Crixás River (Tocantins)
 Cruxati River
 Cubatão River (north Santa Catarina)
 Cubatão River (Paraná)
 Cubatão River (São Paulo)
 Cubatão River (south Santa Catarina)
 Cubatãozinho River
 Cubate River
 Cuc River
 Cuiabá River
 Cuiari River
 Cuiaté River
 Cuieiras River (Demini River)
 Cuieiras River (Rio Negro)
 Cuini River
 Culari River
 Culuene River
 Cumbuco River
 Cuminapanema River
 Cunani River
 Cunaú River
 Cunhãmati River
 Cunhaporanga River
 Das Cunhãs River
 Cuniuá River
 Cupido River
 Cupijó River 
 Cupixi River
 Curaçá River
 Curapi River
 Curiaú River
 Curiche Grande River (Corixa Grande River)
 Curicuriari River
 Curimataí River
 Curimataú River
 Curisevo River
 Curiuaú River
 Currais Novos River
 Curu River
 Curuá do Sul River
 Curuá River (Amazon River)
 Curuá River (Iriri River)
 Curuá River (Mato Grosso)
 Curuá Una River
 Curuaés River
 Curuçá River (Javari River)
 Curuçá River (Pará)
 Curuduri River
 Curupara River
 Curuquetê River
 Cururu River (Ilha de Marajó)
 Cururu River (Tapajós River)
 Cururuaçu River
 Cutanji River
 Cutia River

D–I

 Daraá River
 Demini River
 Descoberto River
 Desquite River
 Diamantina River (Brazil)
 Diamantino River
 Da Direita River
 Da Divisa River
 Doce River
 Doce River
 Doce River (Rio Grande do Norte)
 Dois de Setembro River
 Dois Rios River
 Douradinho River
 Dourado River (Minas Gerais)
 Dourado River (Rio Grande do Sul)
 Dourado River (São Paulo)
 Dourados River (Goiás)
 Dourados River (Mato Grosso do Sul)
 Dourados River (Minas Gerais)
 Dueré River
 D'Una River
 Dos Duques River
 Da Dúvida River
 Das Éguas River (Correntina River)
 Eiru River
 Elvas River
 Embu-Guaçu River
 Embu-Mirim River
 Encantado River
 Endimari River
 Engano River (Itajaí River)
 Engano River (Uruguay River)
 Do Engano River
 Enjeitado River
 Envira River
 Erechim River
 Ereo River
 Ericó River
 Escondido (Guaporé)
 Escurinho River
 Escuro River (Minas Gerais)
 Escuro River (Tocantins)
 Esfolado River
 Espalha River
 Espingarda River
 Espinharas River
 Estiva River
 Estrela River
 Da Faca River
 Fagundes River
 Falsino River
 Fanado River
 Faria River
 Faria Timbó River
 Farinha River
 Da Farinha River
 Da Fartura River
 Feio River
 Feitosa River
 Feliciano River (Brazil)
 Das Fêmeas River
 Ferro River
 Fidalgo River
 Figueiredo River
 Do Filipe River
 Fiúza River
 Flechal River
 Flor do Prado River
 Das Flores River (Maranhão)
 Das Flores River (Rio de Janeiro)
 Das Flores River (Santa Catarina)
 Floriano River (Paraíba)
 Floriano River (Paraná)
 Do Fogo River
 Formiga River (Mato Grosso)
 Formiga River (Tocantins)
 Formoso River (Bahia)
 Formoso River (Goiás)
 Formoso River (Paraná)
 Formoso River (Rondônia)
 Formoso River (Tocantins) (Cristalino River)
 Forqueta River
 Forquetinha River
 Forquilha River
 Forromeco River
 Fortaleza River
 Do Frade River
 Dos Frades River
 Francês River
 Freire Muniz River
 Fresco River
 Fumaça River
 Da Fumaça River
 Fundão River
 Fundo River (Espírito Santo)
 Fundo River (Sergipe)
 Do Funil River
 Furo do Tajapuru
 Furo Santa Rosa
 Do Gado River
 Gajapara River
 Do Galé River
 Galera River
 Galheirão River
 Gameleira River
 Garça River
 Das Garças River (Mato Grosso)
 Das Garças River (Rondônia)
 Garcia River (Brazil)
 Garou River
 Gavião River
 Gemuuma River
 Goiana River
 Goiatá River
 Goio-Bang River
 Goioerê River
 Gonçalves Dias River
 Gongogi River
 Gorutuba River
 Grajaú River (Acre)
 Grajaú River (Maranhão)
 Gramame River
 Rio Grande (Paraná River)
 Grande River (Bahia)
 Grande River (Dois Rios River)
 Grande River (Paraná)
 Grande River (Rio de Janeiro)
 Ribeirão Grande (Tietê River)
 Gravatá River (Minas Gerais)
 Gravatá River (Paraíba)
 Gravatá River (Pernambuco) 
 Gravataí River
 Gregório River (Amazonas)
 Gregório River (Goiás)
 Groaíras River
 Grotão das Arraias River
 Guaiamã River
 Guaíba River
 Guaio River
 Guajará River (Amazon)
 Guajará River (Marajó)
 Guaji River
 Guaju River
 Gualaxo do Sul River
 Guamá River
 Guandu River (Espírito Santo)
 Guandu River (Paraíba)
 Guandu River (Rio de Janeiro)
 Guandu-Mirim River
 Guapi-Áçu River
 Guaporé River
 Guaporé River (Rio Grande do Sul)
 Guará River
 Guarani River
 Guarapari River
 Guarapiranga River
 Guarapó River
 Guaraqueçaba River
 Guaratinguetá River
 Guarauninha River
 Da Guarda River (Itaguaí River)
 Guareí River (Mato Grosso do Sul)
 Guareí River (São Paulo)
 Guariba River (Pauini River)
 Guaribe River
 Guarijuba River
 Guarita River
 Guaritire River
 Guaxindiba River
 Guaxindiba River (Norte Fluminense)
 Guaxindibe River
 Guaxupé River
 Gurguéia River
 Gurinhém River
 Gurinhenzinho River
 Gurjaú River
 Gurupi River
 Gurupí River
 Huaiá-Miçu River
 Humaitã River (Turvo River)
 Humboldt River (Brazil)
 Iá River
 Iaco River
 Iapó River
 Iaué River
 Ibicuí da Armada River
 Ibicuí da Cruz River
 Ibicuí River
 Ibicuí-Mirim River
 Ibirapuitã Chico River
 Ibirapuitã River
 Ibirubá River
 Icamaquã River
 Içana River
 Iconha River
 Igarapé Humaitá
 Iguaçu River (Rio de Janeiro)
 Iguará River
 Iguatemi River
 Iguazu River
 Ijuí River
 Ijuizinho River
 Imabu River
 Imaruí River (Marium River)
 Imbariê River
 Imbaú River
 Do Imbé River
 Imbituva River
 Imboacica River
 Imuti River
 Iná River
 Inajá River
 Inauini River
 Indaiá River
 Indaiá Grande River
 Indaiaçu River
 Indiaroba River
 Do Indio River (Santa Catarina)
 Dos Indios River (Canoas River)
 Dos Indios River (Itajaí River)
 Dos Indios River (lower Ivaí River)
 Dos Indios River (upper Ivaí River)
 Inferno Grande River
 Ingá River
 Ingaí River
 Inhandava River (Forquilha River)
 Inhomirim River
 Inhumas River
 Inhumas River (Mato Grosso do Sul)
 Inipaco River
 Ipanema River
 Ipiranga River (Paraná)
 Ipiranga River (São Paulo)
 Ipiranga River (Pará)
 Ipiranga Brook
 Ipitinga River
 Ipixuna River (Juruá River)
 Ipixuna River (Madeira River)
 Ipixuna River (Purus River)
 Ipojuca River
 Iporã River
 Iquê River
 Iracema River
 Irani River
 Iraputã River
 Iratapina River
 Iratapuru River
 Iratim River
 Iratinzinho River
 Maú River
 Iriri Novo River
 Iriri River (Rio de Janeiro)
 Iriri River
 Itã River
 Itabapoana River
 Itacaiunas River
 Itacambiruçu River
 Itacanoeira River
 Itacarambi River
 Itacolomi River
 Itagacaba River
 Itaguari River
 Itaim River (Minas Gerais)
 Itaim River (Piauí)
 Itaim River (São Paulo)
 Itajaí do Norte River
 Itajaí do Oeste River
 Itajaí do Sul River
 Itajaí-Açu River
 Itajaí-Mirim River
 Itamarandiba River
 Itambacurí River
 Itamirim River
 Itanhaém River
 Itanhauá River
 Itapanhaú River
 Itapará River
 Itaparaná River
 Itapecerica River
 Itapecuru River
 Itapecuruzinho River
 Itapemirim River
 Itapeti River
 Itapetininga River
 Itapicuru River
 Itapicuru-Açu River
 Itapicuru-Mirim River
 Itapirapuã River
 Itapoama River
 Itapoçu River
 Itapocuzinho River
 Itaquai River
 Itaquiraí River
 Itararé River
 Itata River (Brazil)
 Itaueira River
 Itaúna River
 Itaúnas River
 Itauninha River
 Itaxueiras River
 Itimirim River
 Itinguçu River
 Itinga River
 Itiquira River
 Itoupava River
 Itu River
 Itucumã River
 Ituí River
 Ituim River
 Itupeva River
 Ituxi River
 Ivaí River
 Ivaí River (Rio Grande do Sul)
 Ivaizinho River
 Ivinhema River

J–L

 Jabiberi River
 Jaboatão River
 Jabotá River
 Jaburu River
 Jacaraípe River
 Jacarandá River
 Jacaré Pepira River
 Jacaré River (Alagoas)
 Jacaré River (Bahia, Das Contas River)
 Jacaré River (Bahia, São Francisco River)
 Jacaré River (Minas Gerais)
 Jacaré River (Pará)
 Jacaré River (Piquiri River)
 Jacaré River (Purus River)
 Jacaré River (Rio das Cinzas) (Jacarezinho River)
 Jacaré River (Sergipe, Piauí River)
 Jacaré River (Sergipe, São Francisco River)
 Jacarecica River
 Jacaré-Guaçu River
 Jaciparaná River
 Jacoca River (Paraíba)
 Jacoca River (Sergipe)
 Jacu River
 Jacuba River
 Jacuí River
 Jacuí River (São Paulo)
 Jacuí-Mirim River
 Jacuípe River (Bahia)
 Jacuípe River (Paraíba)
 Jacuípe River (Pernambuco)
 Jacuizinho River
 Jacundá River (Pará)
 Jacundá River (Rondônia)
 Jacupiranga River
 Jacuriaí River
 Jacurutu River
 Jacutinga River (Paraná)
 Jacutinga River (Rio das Antas)
 Jacutinga River (Uruguay River)
 Da Jacutinga River
 Jaguarão River
 Jaguari Mirim River
 Jaguari River (Canastra River)
 Jaguari River (Ibicuí River)
 Jaguari River (Paraíba do Sul)
 Jaguari River (Piracicaba River)
 Jaguariaíva River
 Jaguariatu River
 Jaguaribe River
 Jaguarizinho River
 Jagui River
 Jaibaras River
 Jamanxim River
 Jamari River
 Jamicia River
 Jaminauá River
 Jandiatuba River
 Jangada River (Iguazu River)
 Jangada River (Piquiri River)
 Japaratuba River
 Japoré River
 Japuiba River
 Japurá River
 Jaquirana River
 Jaracatiá River
 Jararaca River
 Jaraucu River
 Jardim River (Distrito Federal)
 Jardim River
 Jari River (Purus River)
 Jari River
 Jaru River
 Jataí River
 Jatapu River
 Jatobá River
 Jatuarana River
 Jaú River (Amazonas)
 Jaú River (São Paulo)
 Jauaperi River
 Jauaru River
 Jauquara River
 Jauru River (Mato Grosso do Sul)
 Jauru River (Mato Grosso)
 Javary River
 Jenipapo River
 Jequiá River (Alagoas)
 Jequiá River (Rio de Janeiro) (on Governador Island)
 Jequié River
 Jequiriçá River
 Jequitaí River
 Jequitinhonha River
 Dos Jesuítas River
 Ji-Paraná River (Machado River)
 Jirituba River
 João de Tiba River
 João Leite River
 João Paulo River
 Jordão River (Acre)
 Jordão River (Paraná)
 Jorigue River
 Juami River
 Juari River
 Juazeiro River
 Juba River (Mato Grosso)
 Jucá River
 Jucu Braço Norte River
 Jucu Braço Sul River
 Jucu River
 Jucurucu River
 Jufari River
 Juína River
 Juína-Miriam River
 Juininha River
 Juma River (Brazil)
 Jundiá River (Santa Catarina)
 Jundiá River
 Jundiaí River (Espírito Santo)
 Jundiaí River (Rio Grande do Norte)
 Jundiaí River (upper Tietê River)
 Jundiaí River (São Paulo)
 Jundiuvira River
 Jupati River
 Juqueri River
 Juquiá River
 Jurema River
 Juriti River
 Juruá River (Rondônia)
 Juruá River
 Juruá-Mirim River
 Juruazinho River
 Juruena River
 Jurupari River
 Jutai River
 Jutaizinho River
 Jutuva River
 Kariniutu River
 Kevuaieli River
 Lacerda de Almeida River
 Da Laguna River (Pauxis River)
 Lajeado Grande River (Das Antas River)
 Lajeado Grande River (Rio da Várzea)
 Lajeado River (Maranhão)
 Lajeado River (Paraná)
 Lajeado River (Tocantins)
 Lajeado Sertão
 Das Lajes River
 Ribeirão das Lajes
 Lambari River (Pará River)
 Lambedor River
 Laranjaí River
 Laranjal River
 Laranjeiras River (Paraná)
 Laranjeiras River (Santa Catarina)
 Laranjinha River
 Lava-Tudo River
 Leão River
 Do Leão River
 Lençóis River
 Leste River
 Lever River (Itaberaí River)
 Liberdade River (Juruá River)
 Liberdade River (Xingu River)
 Ligeiro River
 Lôbo d'Almada River
 Longá River
 Lonqueador River
 Lontra River
 Ribeirão Lontra
 Das Lontras River
 Lourenço River
 Lourenço Velho River
 Luís Alves River
 Luna River

M–P

 Macabu River
 Macabuzinho River
 Maçacara River
 Macaco Branco River
 Macaco River
 Macacoari River
 Macacos River (Ceará)
 Macacos River (Paraná)
 Macacu River
 Macaé River
 Macambira River (Ceará) (Inhuçu River)
 Macambira River (Goiás)
 Macari River
 Macauã River
 Macaúba River
 Macaxeira River
 Machadinho River
 Machado River (Minas Gerais)
 Lajeado Macuco
 Macucuaú River
 Madeira River
 Madeirinha River
 Mãe Luzia River
 Magé River
 Magu River
 Maiá River
 Maici River
 Maicuru River
 Mainart River
 Maiquinique River
 Mamanguape River
 Mamboré River
 Mambucaba River
 Mamiá River (Amazonas)
 Mamiá River (Pará)
 Mamoré River
 Mamoriá River
 Mampituba River
 Mamuru River
 Manacapuru River
 Manguaba River
 Dos Mangues River
 Manhuaçu River
 Manicoré River
 Manicorezinho River
 Manissauá-Miçu River
 Mansinho River
 Manso River (Goiás)
 Manso River (Mato Grosso)
 Manso River (Minas Gerais)
 Manuel Alves da Natividade River
 Manuel Alves Grande River
 Manuel Alves Pequeno River
 Manuel Alves River (Santa Catarina)
 Mapaoni River
 Mapari River
 Mapiá Grande River
 Mapiri River
 Mapuá River
 Mapuera River
 Maquiné River
 Maracá River
 Maracacumé River
 Maracaí River
 Maracajá River (Baracaju River)
 Maracanã River (Amazonas)
 Maracanã River (Rio de Janeiro)
 Maracani River
 Maracá-Pucu River
 Maranhão River
 Marapí River
 Marari River
 Maratá River
 Maratasã River
 Marauiá River
 Maré River
 Maria Paula River
 Mariaquã River
 Marié River
 Mariepauá River
 Marimari River
 Mario Preta River
 Mariricu River
 Marituba River
 Marmelada River
 Dos Marmelos River
 Marombas River
 Marrecas River (Belo River)
 Marrecas River (Santana River)
 Das Marrecas River
 Maruanum River
 Marupi River
 Matapi River
 Mataruna River
 Mataurá River
 Matipó River
 Do Mato River (Santa Catarina)
 Mato Rico River
 Dos Matos River
 Matrinxã River
 Matupiri River
 Maués Açu River
 Maurício River
 Maxaranguape River
 Mazomba River
 Mearim River
 Medonho River
 Meia Ponte River
 Do Meio River (Bahia, Corrente River)
 Do Meio River (Bahia, Jequié River)
 Do Meio River (Bahia, Peruípe River)
 Do Meio River (Braço do Norte River)
 Do Meio River (Itajaí River)
 Do Meio River (Paraíba)
 Do Meio River (Paraná)
 Do Meio River (Rio de Janeiro)
 Do Meio River (Rio Grande do Sul)
 Meirim River
 Melchior River
 Melissa River
 Membeca River
 Mequéns River (Guaporé River)
 Mequéns River (São João River)
 Dos Meros River
 Miang River
 Das Minas River
 Mineruázinho River
 Miranda River (Brazil)
 Mirapuxi River
 Miringuava River
 Miriri River
 Miriti River
 Mitéuca River
 Moa River (Brazil)
 Moacir Ávidos River
 Mocambo River
 Mocatu River
 Moções River
 Mocotó River
 Moji-Guaçu River
 Moji-Mirim River
 Moju River (Acará)
 Moju dos Campos River
 Monjolinho River
 Morro Alegre River
 Rio das Mortes (Minas Gerais)
 Rio das Mortes
 Morto River
 Mosquito River (Minas Gerais)
 Mosquito River (Pardo River)
 Mosquito River (Tocantins)
 Do Moura River (Paraná da Viúva River)
 Mourão River
 Moxotó River
 Muaco River
 Mucajaí River
 Mucum River
 Mucuri River
 Mucutá River
 Muguilhão River
 Mumbaba River
 Mundaú River (Ceará)
 Mundaú River
 Munim River
 Muqui do Norte River
 Muqui do Sul River
 Muqui River
 Muriaé River
 Muribaca River
 Muricizal River
 Muru River
 Mururé River
 Mutuacá River
 Mutum River (Amapá)
 Mutum River (Amazonas)
 Mutum River (Espírito Santo)
 Mutum River (Mato Grosso)
 Mutumparaná River
 Mutura River 
 Muzambo River
 Nabileque River
 Igarapé Natal
 Do Navio River
 Negrinho River (Mafra, Santa Catarina)
 Negrinho River (Mato Grosso do Sul)
 Negro River (Mato Grosso do Sul)
 Negro River (Paraná)
 Negro River (Rio de Janeiro)
 Negro River (Rondônia)
 Negro River (Tocantins)
 Rio Negro (Amazon)
 Río Negro (Uruguay)
 Nhamundá River
 Nioaque River
 Noidoro River
 Noucouru River
 Do Norte River (Espírito Santo)
 Nova Lombárdia River
 Novo River (Anauá River)
 Novo River (Coxim River)
 Novo River (Espírito Santo)
 Novo River (Iriri River)
 Novo River (Jamanxim River)
 Novo River (Minas Gerais)
 Novo River (Paraguay River)
 Novo River (Paranapanema River)
 Novo River (Pardo River)
 Novo River (Rondônia)
 Novo River (Santa Catarina)
 Novo River (Xeriuini River) 
 Obim River
 Ocoi River
 Dos Oeiras River
 Ogarantim River (Fortaleza River)
 Dos Oitis River
 Da Onça River (Santa Catarina)
 Das Ondas River
 Oriçanga River
 Orobó River
 Ouricuri River
 Ouro River (Acre)
 Do Ouro River (Bahia)
 Do Ouro River (Goiás)
 Do Ouro River (Rio Grande do Sul)
 Do Ouro River (Santa Catarina)
 Do Ouro River (Rondônia)
 Ouro Preto River
 Oiapoque River
 Pacaás Novos River
 Pacajá River
 Paciá River
 Paciência River
 Pacoti River
 Pacu River (Amajari River)
 Pacu River (Catrimani River)
 Pacu River (Pará)
 Pacuí River (Gorutuba River)
 Pacuí River (São Francisco River)
 Pacuma River
 Pacuneiro River
 Padauari River
 Pagão River
 Pajé River
 Pajeú River
 Palha River
 Palhano River
 Palheiro River
 Palma River
 Palmares River
 Das Palmas River
 Palmeiras River (Goiás)
 Palmeiras River (Tocantins)
 Palmital River (Goiás)
 Palmital River (Paraná)
 Palmital River (Pardo River)
 Palmital River (Santa Catarina)
 Palomas River
 Pampã River
 Panari River
 Panaúba River
 Pancas River
 Pandeiros River
 Panquinhas River
 Pântano River
 Papagaio River (Amazonas)
 Papagaio River (Mato Grosso)
 Dos Papagaios River
 Papocas River
 Papuri River
 Paquequer River (Sumidouro)
 Paquequer River (Teresópolis)
 Pará Mirim River
 Pará River
 Pará River (Minas Gerais)
 Paracaí River (Paraná)
 Paracatu River
 Paracatu River (Brasília de Minas)
 Paracauari River
 Paracauti River
 Paraconi River
 Paracori River
 Parado River
 Paraguaçu River
 Paraguay River
 Paraguazinho River
 Paraíba do Meio River
 Paraíba do Norte River
 Paraíba do Sul
 Paraibinha River (Alagoas)
 Paraibinha River (Paraíba)
 Paraibuna River (São Paulo)
 Paraibuna River (Minas Gerais)
 Paraim River
 Paraitinga River (upper Tietê River)
 Paraitinga River
 Paramirim River
 Paraná River
 Paraná River (Maranhão)
 Igarapé Paraná
 Paraná Urariá
 Paranã River
 Paranã River (Tocantins)
 Paranaíba River
 Paranaíta River
 Paranapanema River
 Paranhana River
 Paranoá River
 Paraopeba River
 Paratari River
 Parateí River (Lambari-Parateí River)
 Paratibe River
 Paratiji River
 Paraú River
 Parauapebas River
 Parauari River
 Pardinho River (Minas Gerais)
 Pardo River (Amazonas)
 Pardo River (Bahia)
 Pardo River (Das Velhas River)
 Pardo River (Mato Grosso do Sul)
 Pardo River (Pará)
 Pardo River (Paranapanema River)
 Pardo River (Ribeira River)
 Pardo River (Rio Grande do Sul)
 Pardo River (Rondônia)
 Pardo River (São Francisco River)
 Pardo River (São Paulo)
 Dos Pardos River (Santa Catarina)
 Parecis River
 Paricarana River
 Parima River
 Parimé River
 Pariquera-Açu River
 Parnaíba River
 Parnaìbinha River
 Parnamirim River
 Paroeira River
 Dos Patos River (Goiás)
 Dos Patos River (Iratim River)
 Dos Patos River (Ivaí River)
 Dos Patos River (Mato Grosso)
 Paru de Oeste River (Cuminá River)
 Paru River
 Passa Cinco River
 Passa Dois River
 Passa Três River
 Passa Una River
 Passo Fundo River
 Pataxós River
 Pati River (Bóia River)
 Pato Branco River
 Pau Alto River
 Pau Atravessado River
 Pau d'Arco River
 Pau Gigante River
 Pauini River (Purus River)
 Pauini River (Unini River)
 Paulista River
 Paulo Diniz River
 Pau-Seco River
 Pavuna River
 Ribeirão da Paz
 Pedra d´Água River
 Da Pedra River
 Das Pedras River (Anhumas River)
 Das Pedras River (Bahia)
 Das Pedras River (Goiás)
 Das Pedras River (Piracicaba River)
 Das Pedras River (Santa Catarina)
 Das Pedras River (Una da Aldeia River)
 Pedreira River
 Peixe River (Bahia)
 Peixe River (Corumbá River)
 Peixe River (Crixás Açu River)
 Peixe River (Das Almas River)
 Peixe River (lower Araguaia River)
 Peixe River (Paraíba)
 Peixe River (upper Araguaia River)
 Do Peixe River (Jaguari River)
 Do Peixe River (Mato Grosso do Sul)
 Do Peixe River (Moji-Guaçu River)
 Do Peixe River (Moji-Guaçu River)
 Do Peixe River (Pará River)
 Do Peixe River (Paraibuna River)
 Do Peixe River (Paraibuna River, São Paulo)
 Do Peixe River (Paraná River)
 Do Peixe River (Santa Catarina)
 Do Peixe River (Sapucaí River)
 Do Peixe River (Tietê River)
 Dos Peixes River (Mato Grosso)
 Peixoto de Azevedo River
 Pelotas River
 Pelotinhas River
 Pendotiba River
 Peperiguaçu River
 Pequeno River (Santa Catarina)
 Pequeno River (São Paulo)
 Perdida River
 Perdido River (Mato Grosso do Sul)
 Perdido River (Paraná)
 Perequê-Áçu River
 Periá River
 Perimbó River
 Peritoró River
 Persinuga River
 Peruaçu River
 Perucaba River
 Peruípe River
 Da Pescaria River
 Pesqueiro River
 Petita River (Porto Alegre River)
 Piabanha River
 Piaçaca River
 Piaí River
 Piancó River
 Piauí River
 Piauí River (Alagoas)
 Piauí River (Minas Gerais)
 Piauí River (Sergipe)
 Piauitinga River
 Piaus River
 Picuí River
 Piedade River
 Pilões River (São Paulo)
 Pimenta Bueno River
 Pimpão River
 Ribeirão Pindaíba
 Pindaré River
 Pinguim River
 Pinhal Grande River
 Pinhal River
 Pinhão River
 Pinheirinho River
 Pinheiros River (Jurabatuba River)
 Pinhuã River
 Pintado River
 Do Pinto River
 Piorini River
 Pipiripau River
 Piquiri River (Paraná)
 Piquirí River (São Lourenço)
 Pirabeiraba River
 Piracanjuba River (Corumbá River)
 Piracanjuba River (Paranaíba River)
 Piracicaba River (Minas Gerais)
 Piracicaba River
 Piraçupiá River (Santa Rita River)
 Piracuruca River
 Piraí River (Paraná)
 Piraí River (Rio de Janeiro)
 Piraí River (Santa Catarina)
 Piraí-Mirim River
 Piraju River
 Pirajuí River
 Piranema River
 Pirangi River
 Piranhas River
 Piranhas River (Goiás)
 Piranhas River (lower Araguaia River)
 Piranhas River (upper Araguaia River)
 Piranji River (Pernambuco)
 Piranji River (Piauí)
 Pirapama River
 Pirapemas River
 Pirapetinga River
 Pirapetinga River (upper Paraíba do Sul)
 Pirapó River
 Pirapozinho River
 Piraquara River
 Piraquê Açu River
 Piraquê River
 Piraquê-Mirim River
 Pirari River
 Piratinga River
 Piratini River (Uruguay River)
 Piratini River
 Piratucu River
 Piriá River (Pará River)
 Piriá River (Eastern Pará)
 Piripucu River
 Pitanga River (Paraná)
 Pitanga River (Pernambuco)
 Pitanga River (Sergipe)
 Pitangueiras River
 Pitangui River
 Pitimbu River
 Pitinga River
 Pium River
 Pium River (Pará)
 Poana River
 Poço Bonito River
 Poço Triste River
 Dos Poços River
 Poguba River (Vermelho River)
 Pojuca River
 Pomba River
 Das Pombas River
 Pomonga River
 Pongal River
 Ponta Grossa River
 Pontal River
 Ponte Alta River
 Ponte de Pedra River
 Porcos River
 Dos Porcos River (Bahia)
 Dos Porcos River (Santa Catarina)
 Porto das Caixas River
 Dos Portões River
 Potengi River (Potenji River, Rio Grande do Norte)
 Poti River
 Potinga River
 Povoamento River
 Poxim Açu River
 Poxim Mirim River
 Poxim River
 Pracaí River
 Pracumba River
 Pracupí River
 Pracuúba River
 Da Prata River (Espírito Santo)
 Da Prata River (Goiás)
 Da Prata River (Paracatu River)
 Da Prata River (Paraná)
 Da Prata River (Rio Grande do Sul)
 Da Prata River (Santa Catarina)
 Da Prata River (Tijuco River) 
 Da Prata River (Tocantins)
 Prataji River
 Prato River (Espírito Santo)
 Pratudão River
 Preguiças River
 Preto da Eva River
 Preto de Candeias River
 Preto do Crespo River
 Prêto do Igapó-Açu River
 Preto River (Amapá)
 Preto River (Bahia, Atlantic Ocean)
 Preto River (Bahia, Grande River)
 Preto River (Cricaré River)
 Preto River (Itabapoana River)
 Preto River (Itaúnas River) (Itauninhas River)
 Preto River (Maranhão)
 Preto River (Mariricu River)
 Preto River (Negro River)
 Preto River (Padauari River)
 Preto River (Paracatu River)
 Preto River (Paraíba)
 Preto River (Paraibuna River)
 Preto River (Paraná)
 Preto River (Paranaíba River)
 Preto River (Pernambuco)
 Preto River (Piabanha River)
 Preto River (Rio do Peixe)
 Preto River (Rondônia)
 Preto River (Roraima)
 Preto River (São Paulo)
 Preto River (Tocantins River)
 Preto River (Unini River)
 Preto River (Ururaí River)
 Puduari River
 Púlpito River
 Punaú River
 Pureté River
 Puruba River
 Puruê River
 Purus River
 Putumayo River
 Puturã River

Q–S

 Quaraí River
 Quartel River
 Do Quati River
 Quatro Cachoeiras River
 Quebra-Anzol River
 Quebra-Dentes River
 Queimados River
 Quilombo River (Juquiá River)
 Quinó River
 Quinze de Novembro River (Espírito Santo)
 Quinze de Novembro River (Santa Catarina)
 Quitauau River
 Quitéria River
 Quitéro River
 Quixeramobim River
 Quixito River
 Rancho Grande River
 Das Rãs River
 Ratones River
 Real River (Brazil)
 Regame River
 Reis Magos River
 Represa Grande River
 Riachão River (Bahia)
 Riacho River (Espírito Santo)
 Ribeira de Iguape River
 Ribeira River (Paraíba)
 Ribeira River (Paraná)
 Ribeirão River (Araraduara River)
 Rio de Janeiro (Bahia)
 Riozinho River (Amazonas)
 Riozinho River (Braço Menor)
 Riozinho River (Pará)
 Riozinho River (Pium River)
 Igarapé Riozinho
 Do Rocha River (Paraná)
 Roda Velha River
 Rodeador River
 Rolante River
 Rolim de Moura River
 Rondi Toró River
 Ronuro River
 Roosevelt River
 Rubim do Norte River
 Rubim do Sul River
 Sabugi River
 Saco River (Maranhão)
 Saco River (Paracauari)
 Do Saco River (Rio de Janeiro)
 Sacraiú River
 Sacre River (Mato Grosso)
 Sacuriuiná River
 Sagradouro Grande River
 Do Sal River (Goiás)
 Do Sal River (Sergipe)
 Sal Amargo River
 Salabro River
 Salgadinho River
 Salgado River (Alagoas)
 Salgado River (Ceará)
 Salgado River (Rio Grande do Norte) (Amargoso River)
 Salgado River (São Francisco River)
 Salgado River (Sergipe River)
 Salgado River (Vaza-Barris River)
 Salinas River (Minas Gerais)
 Das Salinas River
 Salitre River
 Salobra River
 Salto River (Paraíba)
 Do Salto River (Paraná)
 Do Salto River (Rio de Janeiro)
 Salvador River (Paraíba)
 Samambaia River
 Samambaia River (Goiás)
 Sambito River
 Sana River (Rio de Janeiro)
 Sangue River
 Do Sangue River
 Sanhauá River
 Santa Catarina River (Minas Gerais)
 Santa Catarina River (Rio de Janeiro)
 Santa Cruz River (Santa Catarina)
 Santa Joana River
 Santa Júlia River
 Santa Maria da Vitória River
 Santa Maria do Rio Doce River
 Santa Maria River (Mato Grosso do Sul)
 Santa Maria River (Rio Grande do Sul)
 Santa Maria River (Sergipe)
 Ribeirão Santa Maria
 Santa Quitéria River
 Santa Rosa River (Acre)
 Santa Rosa River (Rio Grande do Sul)
 Santa Tereza River
 Santana River (Bahia)
 Santana River (Espírito Santo)
 Santana River (Maranhão)
 Santana River (Mato Grosso do Sul)
 Santana River (Minas Gerais)
 Santana River (Paraná)
 Santana River (Rio de Janeiro)
 Sant'Ana River (Piedade River)
 Sant'Ana River (Rio da Areia)
 Ribeirão Santana
 Santo Agostinho River
 Santo Anastácio River
 Santo Antônio River (Amapá)
 Santo Antônio River (Bahia)
 Santo Antônio River (Doce River)
 Santo Antônio River (Itaúnas River)
 Santo Antônio River (Paraná)
 Santo Antônio River (Rio de Janeiro)
 Santo Antônio River (Rio do Sono)
 Santo Antônio River (Santa Catarina)
 Santo Antônio River (Tocantins)
 Santo Antônio Grande River
 Santo Cristo River
 Santo Onofre River
 São Bartolomeu River
 São Benedito River
 São Bento River (Goiás)
 São Bento River (Mãe Luzia River)
 São Bento River (Rio do Peixe)
 São Bernardo River (Distrito Federal)
 São Bernardo River (Goiás)
 São Desidério River
 São Domingos Grande River
 São Domingos River (Goiás)
 São Domingos River (Mato Grosso do Sul)
 São Domingos River (Minas Gerais)
 São Domingos River (Rio de Janeiro)
 São Domingos River (Rio Grande do Sul)
 São Domingos River (Rondônia)
 São Domingos River (Santa Catarina)
 São Domingos River (São Paulo)
 São Domingos River (Tocantins)
 São Fernando River (Rio de Janeiro)
 São Francisco River
 São Francisco River (Belo River)
 São Francisco River (Jaciparaná River)
 São Francisco River (Jequitinhonha River)
 São Francisco River (Paraíba)
 São Francisco River (Paraná)
 São Francisco River (Rio de Janeiro)
 São Francisco River (São Miguel River)
 São Francisco Falso Braço Norte River
 São Francisco Falso Braço Sul River
 São Gonçalo Channel
 São Gonçalo River
 São Jerônimo River (Pinhão River)
 São Jerônimo River (Tibagi River)
 São João da Barra River
 São João de Meriti River (Meriti River)
 São João do Paraíso River
 São João Grande River
 São João Pequeno River
 São João River (Canoas River)
 São João River (Cubatão River)
 São João River (Iguazu River)
 São João River (Ji-Paraná River)
 São João River (Mato Grosso do Sul)
 São João River (Mato Grosso)
 São João River (Minas Gerais)
 São João River (Negro River)
 São João River (Paraná River)
 São João River (Dos Patos River)
 São João River (Pernambuco)
 São João River (Pitangui River)
 São João River (Rio de Janeiro)
 São João River (Verde River)
 Igarapé São João
 São João Surrá River
 São José do Guapiara River
 São José dos Cordeiros River
 São José dos Dourados River
 São José River (Espírito Santo)
 São Lourenço River (Juquiá River)
 São Lourenço River (Mato Grosso)
 São Lourenço River (Paraná)
 São Lourenço River (Rio Grande do Sul)
 São Lourenço River (Tietê River)
 São Luís River (Acre)
 São Luís River (Amapá)
 São Marcos River
 São Mateus River (Santa Catarina)
 São Mateus River
 São Miguel River (Alagoas)
 São Miguel River (Espírito Santo)
 São Miguel River (Minas Gerais)
 São Miguel River (Rondônia)
 São Nicolau River
 São Patrício River
 São Pedro River (Alonzo River)
 São Pedro River (Guandu River)
 São Pedro River (Macaé River)
 São Pedro River (Minas Gerais)
 São Pedro River (Pernambuco)
 São Pedro River (Rondônia)
 São Pedro River (Santa Catarina)
 São Pedro River (São Paulo)
 São Sebastião River (Espírito Santo)
 São Sebastião River (Paraná)
 São Sepe River
 São Simão River
 São Tomás River
 São Tomé River (Mato Grosso)
 São Valério River
 São Venceslau River
 Sapão River
 Sapucaí River (Minas Gerais)
 Sapucaí River (Paraná) (Reboucas River)
 Sapucaí River (São Paulo)
 Sapucaia River
 Sapucai-Mirim River
 Saracura River
 Saracuruna River
 Sarapuí River (São Paulo)
 Sarapuí River (Rio de Janeiro)
 Sararé River
 Sargento River
 Satuba River
 Saudades River (lower Chapecó River)
 Saudades River (upper Chapecó River)
 Sauêruiná River
 Sepatini River
 Sepoti River
 Sepotuba River
 Sereno River
 Sergipe River
 Seridó River
 Seriema River
 Serra Negra River
 Seruini River
 Sesmarias River
 Sete de Setembro River
 Setúbal River
 Siemens River
 Igarapé Sindrichal
 Dos Sinos River
 Siriji River
 Sirinhaém River
 Siriri River
 Sitiá River
 Sobradinho Creek
 Socavão River
 Socorro River
 Soé River
 Sombrio River (Brazil)
 Do Sono River (Minas Gerais)
 Do Sono River (Tocantins)
 Sorocaba River
 Sororò River
 Sotério River
 Soturno River
 Suaçuí Grande River
 Suaçuí Pequeno River
 Suçuarana River
 Sucunduri River
 Sucuriú River
 Sucuru River
 Suia-Miçu River
 Sumidouro Grande River
 Sumidouro River
 Surubiu River
 Suruí River
 Surumu River
 Suzana River

T–Z

 Tabatinga River
 Taboco River
 Tacaniça River
 Tacunapi River
 Tacutu River
 Tadarimana River
 Taiaçupeba River
 Taiaçupeba-Mirim River
 Tainhas River
 Taió River
 Taíras River
 Tajauí River
 Tamanduá River
 Tamanduateí River
 Tamitatoale River
 Tanaru River
 Tangararé River
 Tapacurã River
 Tapajós River
 Tapauá River
 Tapera River (Paraíba)
 Tapera River (Paraná)
 Taperoá River
 Tapira River
 Tapiracuí River
 Tapirapé River (Mato Grosso)
 Tapirapé River (Pará)
 Tapirucu River
 Tapuio River
 Taquara River
 Taquaraçu River (Mato Grosso do Sul)
 Taquaraçu River (Espírito Santo)
 Taquari River (Mato Grosso do Sul)
 Taquari River (Rio Grande do Sul)
 Taquari River-Mirim (Rio Grande do Sul)
 Taquari-Guaçu River
 Taquari-Mirim River (Mato Grosso do Sul)
 Taquaruçu River
 Taquaruçu River (São Paulo)
 Tarauacá River
 Tartarugal Grande River
 Tartarugalzinho River
 Tarumã Açu River
 Tarumã Mirim River
 Tarunã River
 Tatuamunha River
 Tatuí River
 Tatuí River (Paraná)
 Tauini River
 Tavares River
 Tea River
 Tefé River
 Tejo River
 Teles Pires
 Da Telha River
 Tenente Marques River
 Tererê River
 Terra Nova River (Pernambuco)
 Tesoura River
 Tibagi River
 Tibiri River
 Tibiriça River
 Tietê River
 Tijipió River
 Tijucas River
 Tijuco River
 Tijuípe River
 Timbó River
 Timbozinho River
 Timbuí River
 Timonha River
 Tinguá River
 Tiúba River
 Tocantins River
 Tocantins River (Jamanxim River)
 Tocantizinho River
 Todos os Santos River
 Tomé River
 Tonantins River
 Toototobi River
 Tormenta River
 Toropi River
 Tourinho River
 Dos Touros River
 Tracunhaém River
 Traida River
 Traipu River
 Traira River
 Trairão River
 Traíras River (Goiás)
 Trairi River (Ceará)
 Trairi River (Rio Grande do Norte)
 Trairi River (Roraima)
 Tramandaí River
 Trapicheiros River
 Três Barras River (Paraná)
 Três Barras River (Santa Catarina)
 Três Bôcas River
 Três Forquilhas River
 Três Voltas River
 Tributo River
 Tricolor River
 Tromaí River
 Trombetas River
 Trombudo River
 Das Tropas River
 Truçu River
 Tubarão River
 Tucunduba River
 Tucurui River
 Tucutol River
 Tueré River
 Tumiã River
 Tupana River
 Turiaçu River
 Turvo River (Goiás)
 Turvo River (Grande River)
 Turvo River (Itapetininga River)
 Turvo River (Minas Gerais)
 Turvo River (Paraná)
 Turvo River (Pardo (Paranapanema) River)
 Turvo River (Rio de Janeiro)
 Turvo River (Rio Grande do Sul)
 Tutuí River
 Uaçá River
 Uaicurapa River
 Uailan River
 Uarini River
 Uatatas River
 Uatumã River
 Uauaris River
 Ubatiba River
 Ubatuba River
 Ubazinho River
 Uberaba River (Minas Gerais)
 Uberaba River (Paraná)
 Uberabinha River
 Uimeerê River
 Umari River
 Umari River (Rio Grande do Norte)
 Do Umbuzeiro River
 Umbuzerio River
 Una River (Itaete, Bahia) 
 Una River (Una, Bahia) 
 Una River (Valença, Bahia) 
 Una River (Paraíba)
 Una River (Pernambuco)
 Una River (Rio de Janeiro)
 Una do Prelado River
 Uneiuxi River
 Unini River
 Upanema River
 Uraim River
 Uraricaá River
 Uraricoera River
 Uriuana River
 Uru River (Goiás)
 Uru River (Maranhão)
 Uruá River
 Urubaxi River
 Urubu River (Amazonas)
 Urubu River (Rio de Janeiro)
 Urubu River (Roraima)
 Urubu Grande River (Das Pedras River)
 Urucaua River
 Urucu River
 Uruçuí Prêto River
 Urucuia River
 Uruçuí-Vermelho River
 Uruguay River
 Urupá River
 Urupaça River
 Urupadi River
 Ururaí River
 Urussanga River
 Utinga River
 Vacacaí River
 Vacacaí-Mirim River
 Vacaria River
 Vacaria River (Minas Gerais)
 Vacas Gordas River
 Valparaiso River (Brazil)
 Varadouro River
 Vargem do Braço River
 Da Várzea River (Iguazu River)
 Da Várzea River (Negro River)
 Da Várzea River (Rio Grande do Sul)
 Uaupés River
 Vaza-Barris River
 Vazante Grande
 Veado River (Itabapoana River)
 Veado River (Santo Antônio River)
 Do Veado River
 Das Velhas River
 Velho River (São Paulo)
 Verde Grande River
 Verde Pequeno River
 Verde River (Bahia)
 Verde River (Bolivia)
 Verde River (Das Almas River)
 Verde River (Das Bois River) (Verdão River)
 Verde River (Grande River)
 Rio Verde (Guaporé River tributary, Mato Grosso)
 Rio Verde (Guaporé River tributary, Rondônia)
 Verde River (Jamari River)
 Verde River (lower Paranaíba River)
 Verde River (Maranhão River)
 Verde River (Mato Grosso do Sul)
 Verde River (Piquiri River)
 Verde River (Sacre River)
 Verde River (São Paulo)
 Verde River (Sapucaí River)
 Verde River (Teles Pires River)
 Verde River (Tocantins)
 Verde River (upper Paranaíba River)
 Verdinho River
 Vereda Pimenteira
 Veríssimo River
 Vermelho River (Corrente River)
 Vermelho River (Iguazu River)
 Vermelho River (Manuel Alves Grande River)
 Vermelho River (Mato Grosso)
 Vermelho River (Palmeiras River)
 Vermelho River (Pará)
 Vermelho River (Paranapanema River)
 Vermelho River (Perdida River)
 Vermelho River (Rondônia)
 Vermelho River (Santa Catarina)
 Vila Nova River
 Viruaquim River
 Vitorino River
 Vorá River
 Xambrê River
 Xaparu River
 Xapuri River
 Xavante River (Mato Grosso)
 Xavante River (Tocantins)
 Xavantinho River
 Xeriuini River
 Xeruã River
 Xie River (Brazil)
 Ximim-Ximim River
 Xingu River
 Xinxim River
 Xipamanu River
 Zumbi River
 Zutia River

See also 
Geography of Brazil#Rivers and lakes
 List of rivers of the Americas by coastline

Movimento dos Atingidos por Barragens

External links
Brazil Water Basins Map

Brazil